Notagonum marginellum is a species of ground beetle in the subfamily Platyninae. It was described by Wilhelm Ferdinand Erichson in 1842.

References

Notagonum
Beetles described in 1842